Ramdarash Mishra (born 15 August 1924) is an Indian poet and litterateur. Ramdarsh has to his credit 32 collections of poems, 30 short-story collections, 15 novels, 15 books of literary criticism, 4 collections of essays, travelogues, and several memoirs.

Awards and honours 
 Sahitya Akademi Award, 2015
 Saraswati Samman, 2021

References

External links

1924 births
Living people
Recipients of the Saraswati Samman Award
Recipients of the Sahitya Akademi Award in Hindi